Markeith Ambles (born November 26, 1991) is an American professional gridiron football wide receiver for the Toronto Argonauts of the Canadian Football League (CFL). He played college football at Houston. He has also been a member of the Calgary Stampeders.

College career
Ambles began his college career at USC in 2010. He was suspended in October 2010 due to late arrivals to team functions. After being dismissed from the team in November, he rejoined the team in January 2011. Ambles withdrew from USC in August 2011 after being declared academically ineligible. After spending the 2012 season with Arizona Western College, he transferred to Houston in April 2013. Ambles played for Houston in 2013 and 2014.

Professional career

Toronto Argonauts 
In May 2016, Ambles signed with the Toronto Argonauts. He was released by the club as part of the team's final cuts before the start of the season.

Calgary Stampeders 
Ambles signed with the Calgary Stampeders on March 15, 2018. He was promoted to the active roster in September 2018. Ambles caught 28 passes for 306 yards with four touchdowns in eight games in the 2018 season before being injured just before the 106th Grey Cup which the Stamps went on to win. In his second season with the Stampeders Ambles caught 35 passes for 407 yards in nine games. He suffered an ankle injury in late September 2019 which caused him to miss the remainder of the season. He re-signed with the Stampeders on December 30, 2020. However, the 2020 CFL season was cancelled and he did not play that year. In 2021, he played in all 14 regular season games where he had 54 receptions for 686 yards and three touchdowns. He became a free agent upon the expiry of his contract on February 8, 2022.

Toronto Argonauts
On February 10, 2022, it was announced that Ambles had signed with the Toronto Argonauts. He continued his strong play in Toronto, setting new personal bests for games played (18), receptions (72), yards (737), and touchdowns (5). He won the 109th Grey Cup to conclude the 2022 season. On February 21, 2023, one week after becoming a free agent, Ambles and the Argos agreed on a new contract.

References

External links
Toronto Argonauts bio
Houston Cougars football bio

1991 births
Living people
American players of Canadian football
American football wide receivers
Canadian football wide receivers
USC Trojans football players
Arizona Western Matadors football players
Houston Cougars football players
Calgary Stampeders players
Toronto Argonauts players
People from McDonough, Georgia
Players of Canadian football from Georgia (U.S. state)